The 2014–15 Championnat LNA season was the 84th season of the top tier basketball league in Switzerland. The season started on October 4, 2014 and ended on May 23, 2015.

Regular season

First stage

|}

Second stage

|}

Playoffs

References

External links 
 

Championnat LNA seasons
Swiss
basketball
basketball